Guillaume Ronan Furrer (born 28 January 2001) is a Swiss professional footballer who plays as a forward for 3. Liga club SC Freiburg II and the Switzerland national under-20 team.

References

External links

2001 births
Living people
Swiss men's footballers
Sportspeople from the canton of Geneva
Association football forwards
Switzerland youth international footballers
Servette FC players
FC Zürich players
SC Freiburg II players
Swiss Promotion League players
3. Liga players
Regionalliga players